Matthew Stieger (born 14 February 1991) is an Australian professional golfer. 

Stieger won  the Australian Amateur in 2011. He also won the Tasmanian Open in 2011.

Stieger turned professional in late 2012 and won the 2012 New South Wales PGA Championship on the PGA Tour of Australasia.

Amateur wins
2009 Handa Junior Masters
2011 Australian Amateur

Professional wins (2)

PGA Tour of Australasia wins (1)

PGA Tour of Australasia playoff record (0–1)

Other wins (1)
2011 Tasmanian Open (as an amateur)

Team appearances
Amateur
Eisenhower Trophy (representing Australia): 2012
Australian Men's Interstate Teams Matches (representing New South Wales): 2010, 2011

References

External links

Australian male golfers
PGA Tour of Australasia golfers
Asian Tour golfers
1991 births
Living people